The Saracco government of Italy held office from 24 June 1900 until 15 February 1901, a total of 236 days, or 7 months and 22 days.

Government parties
The government was composed by the following parties:

Composition

References

Italian governments
1900 establishments in Italy